Evadale High School is a public high school in Evadale, Texas, United States and classified as a 2A school by the UIL.  It is part of the Evadale Independent School District which is located in the southwest tip of Jasper County.  In 2015, the school was rated "Met Standard" by the Texas Education Agency.

The district made news in June 2015 for refusing to change their Confederate Flag inspired crest despite pressure to do so.

Athletics 
The Evadale Rebels compete in Volleyball, Football, Basketball, Track, Baseball & Softball.

Catfish Festival 
Every year in May, the Evadale Catfish Festival is held on the High School grounds.

References

External links 
 Evadale ISD
 Evadale Catfish Festival

Schools in Jasper County, Texas
Public high schools in Texas
Flag controversies in the United States